Burhan Özbilici is a Turkish photojournalist. In 2017 he won World Press Photo of the Year for his image of the assassination of Andrei Karlov, the Russian Ambassador to Turkey.

Life and work

Ozbilici grew up in Turkey. He joined Associated Press (AP) as a full-time photo stringer in 1989 and became a staff photographer in 1996.

Awards
2017: Winner, World Press Photo of the Year, World Press Photo, Amsterdam for his image of the assassination of Andrei Karlov, the Russian Ambassador to Turkey.
2017: First prize, Spot News, Stories category, World Press Photo, Amsterdam

See also
The execution of Nguyễn Văn Lém by General Nguyễn Ngọc Loan, a photograph of which by AP photographer Eddie Adams won First Prize in the Spot News, Singles category of the 1968 World Press Photo contest, and the 1969 Pulitzer Prize for Spot News Photography

References

External links

Associated Press photographers
Turkish photojournalists
Date of birth missing (living people)
Place of birth missing (living people)
Living people
Year of birth missing (living people)